The Americas Nines is a rugby league nines competition staged by the Canada Rugby League and was founded in 2018. The first tournament occurred on May 18, 2019 at Lamport Stadium in Toronto, Ontario, Canada.

2019

Men's pool

Round 1

Round 2

Round 3

Consolation final

Final

Women's pool

References

See also 

Rugby league nines
Rugby league in Canada
2019 in Canadian rugby league